James McInerney is  an Irish sportsperson. He plays hurling with his local club Newmarket and is a member of the Clare senior hurling team.

He won the 2016 All-Ireland Poc Fada Championship.

References

Living people
Newmarket hurlers
Clare inter-county hurlers
Year of birth missing (living people)